Danneels is a Belgian surname. Notable people with the surname include:

Godfried Danneels (1933–2019), Belgian cardinal
Gustave Danneels (1913–1976), Belgian cyclist

See also
Daneels

Dutch-language surnames
Patronymic surnames
Surnames of Belgian origin